FK Řezuz Děčín is a Czech football club located in Děčín, Czech Republic.

League and cup history

Last Updated: 19 June 2011.P = Position; Pld = Matches played; W = Matches won; D = Matches drawn; L = Matches lost; GF = Goals for; GA = Goals against; GD = Goal difference; Pts = Points;

References

External links
 Official website 

Football clubs in the Czech Republic
Association football clubs established in 1999
FK Řezuz Děčín
1999 establishments in the Czech Republic